Piletocera atrata is a moth of the family Crambidae found in Papua New Guinea.

References

atrata
Endemic fauna of Papua New Guinea
Moths of Papua New Guinea
Moths described in 1900